Admiral Sir Algernon Charles Fieschi Heneage  (19 March 1833 – 10 June 1915) was a Royal Navy officer who went on to be Commander-in-Chief, The Nore. Dubbed "Pompo," he was known for his immaculate dress and his white-glove inspections of the ships under his command.

Early life
Born at Arthingworth, Northamptonshire, Heneage was the son of Charles Fieschi Heneage, by his marriage to Louisa Elizabeth Graves, a daughter of Thomas Graves, 2nd Baron Graves. His father was then a Captain in the British Army.

Naval career
Heneage was commissioned as a lieutenant into the Royal Navy in 1854. In 1861, he was commanding officer of HMS Falcon, part of the West Africa Squadron. Promoted to captain in 1866, he took command of HMS Rodney in 1867 and then HMS Warrior in 1881. He was appointed Commander-in-Chief, Pacific Station in 1887 and Commander-in-Chief, The Nore in 1892.

Following the succession of King Edward VII, he was among several retired admirals advanced to Knight Grand Cross of the Order of the Bath (GCB) in the 1902 Coronation Honours list published on 26 June 1902, and received the insignia in an investiture on board the royal yacht Victoria and Albert outside Cowes on 15 August 1902, the day before the fleet review held there to mark the coronation.

He died in 1915 and is buried at Brompton Cemetery.

Family
In 1874 he married Louisa Emma Antrobus, a daughter of Sir Edmund Antrobus, 3rd Baronet; they had one daughter.

References

External links
 

|-

1833 births
1915 deaths
Royal Navy admirals
Knights Grand Cross of the Order of the Bath
Military personnel from Northamptonshire
Burials at Brompton Cemetery
People from West Northamptonshire District
Officers of the West Africa Squadron